Harper  may refer to:

Names
 Harper (name), a surname and given name

Places
in Canada
Harper Islands, Nunavut
Harper, Prince Edward Island

In the United States
Harper, former name of Costa Mesa, California in Orange County
Harper, Illinois
Harper, Indiana
Harper, Iowa
Harper, Kansas
Harper, Kentucky
Harper, Missouri
Harper, Logan County, Ohio
Harper, Ross County, Ohio
Harper, Oregon
Harper, Texas
Harper, Utah
Harper, Washington
Harper, Wyoming

Elsewhere
Harper, Liberia
 Harper River in Canterbury, New Zealand
Harper Adams University, Shropshire, United Kingdom.

Court cases
 Harper v. Virginia Board of Elections, 383 U.S. 663 (1966), overruling Breedlove v. Suttles, 302 U.S. 277 (1937)

Other uses
 Harper, a harp player
Harper (film), a 1966 film starring Paul Newman and Lauren Bacall
 Harper (publisher), an American publishing house, the imprint of global publisher HarperCollins
Harper College, a community college in Palatine, Illinois, USA
 Short name for harper by Harper's Bazaar
 Harper (Forgotten Realms), a member of a fictional semi-secret organization

See also
 Harper County (disambiguation)
 Harper Road (disambiguation)
 Harper Township (disambiguation)
 Harpers (disambiguation)
 Harper's (disambiguation)
 Harpers Ferry (disambiguation)
 Harp (disambiguation)
 Happer (disambiguation)